Thalassodrilus is a genus of annelids belonging to the family Naididae.

The species of this genus are found in Europe and Northern America.

Species:
 Thalassodrilus bicki Erséus, 1994 
 Thalassodrilus bruneti Erséus, 1990

References

Naididae